Svetlana Kuznetsova was the defending champion, but was forced to withdraw due to a left abdominal strain.

Sixth-seeded Ágnes Szávay won in the final  6–7(7–9), 7–5, 6–2, against Jelena Janković, saving a match point in the second set.

Former World No. 1 Martina Hingis played her final professional singles match in the second round, where she lost to home favorite Peng Shuai.

Seeds
The top four seeds received a bye into the second round.

Draw

Finals

Top half

Bottom half

Qualifying

Seeds

Qualifiers

Lucky loser
  María Emilia Salerni

Qualifying draw

First qualifier

Second qualifier

Third qualifier

Fourth qualifier

External links
Official results archive (ITF)
Official results archive (WTA)

China Open
2007 China Open (tennis)